Mahmut Yılmaz (born 6 October 1979) is a German former professional footballer who played as a forward. He also holds Turkish citizenship.

Career
Yılmaz joined Eintracht Norderstedt in January 2008.

References

External links
 
 
 

1979 births
Living people
German people of Turkish descent
German footballers
Turkish footballers
Footballers from Hamburg
Association football forwards
Germany youth international footballers
Germany under-21 international footballers
Bundesliga players
Süper Lig players
Hamburger SV players
Hamburger SV II players
Manisaspor footballers
Türk Telekom G.S.K. footballers
FC Eintracht Norderstedt 03 players